La casa de las muchachas is a 1969 Mexican comedy film directed by Fernando Cortés and starring Amparo Rivelles, Enrique Rambal, Maura Monti, Gilda Mirós and Malú Reyes.

Plot
A Mexican, winner of the Nobel Prize, returns to the town where he was born. The local authorities, in tribute, decide to place a plaque on the house where he was born, only to realize that his birthplace is now the local brothel. Consequently, they try to ask the madame to leave the house with her prostitutes and she refuses, but when the honoree arrives, she and her pupils pass themselves as a widow and her decent daughters. From there, the man involuntarily transforms the brothel into a decent house.

Reparto
Amparo Rivelles as Doña Marta
Enrique Rambal as Marcelo Ledón
Maura Monti as Ana Luisa "La Marquesa"
Gilda Mirós as Amalia "La Profe"
Malú Reyes
Héctor Lechuga as Commissioner
Óscar Ortiz de Pinedo as Ahumado Cienfuegos, chief of the fire department
Óscar Pulido as Abundio Oropeza, Mayor
Carolina Cortázar
Alfredo Varela as Ramirito
Antonio Raxel as Fernández (as Antonio Raxell)
Arturo Cobo
Gloria Jordán
Florencio Castelló
Mario Herrera
Ada Carrasco 
Clara Osollo
Reyna Dunn
Rogelio Moreno
Julián de Meriche

References

External links

1969 comedy films
1969 films
Mexican comedy films
Films directed by Fernando Cortés
1960s Mexican films